Avvy Yao-Yao Go  (born 1963, in Hong Kong) is a Canadian lawyer and judge. She is known for her work advocating on behalf of immigrant and racialized communities in Canada. In 2014 she was appointed to the Order of Ontario. In August 2021, Go was appointed to the Federal Court.

Life and education 
Go was born in 1963 in Hong Kong and emigrated to Canada with her parents in 1982. She received her B.A. from the University of Waterloo in 1986, her L.L.B. from the University of Toronto Faculty of Law in 1989, and her L.L.M. from Osgoode Hall Law School in 1999. She was called to the Bar in Ontario in 1991.

Career 
Go became Acting Executive Director of the Chinese Canadian National Council (CCNC) in 1988 and President of the Toronto Chapter of the CCNC in 1989. In that role, she became involved in the Redress Campaign for the Chinese Head Tax and Exclusion Act.

After completing her articles with Toronto-based law firm WeirFoulds, Go worked as a Legal Researcher at Women's Legal Education & Action Fund (LEAF) before entering the legal clinic system as a Staff Lawyer for East Toronto Community Legal Services and Parkdale Community Legal Services.

In 1992, she became the Executive Director of the Metro Toronto Chinese & Southeast Asian Legal Clinic, a community legal aid clinic which provides free legal services to low-income, non-English speaking individuals in the Chinese, Vietnamese, Cambodian, and Laotian communities in the Greater Toronto Area.  In 2015, her organization hosted a series of workshops to assist people with applying for citizenship ahead of a new government coming into power in Canada. She was still with the organization in 2016 and 2017, where she served as the Clinic Director.

Go was elected as a Bencher of Law Society of Upper Canada in 2001, 2006, and again in 2013. 

In 2002, Go was co-counsel in a class action lawsuit, Mack v Canada (AG), on behalf of Chinese head tax payers and their descendants against the Government of Canada to seek redress for the harmful effect of discriminatory Chinese head tax and Chinese Exclusion Act. Although the litigation was ultimately unsuccessful, it increased political pressure on the government to address this issue and help lead to an official apology by the Prime Minister of Canada on June 22, 2006 and the payment of symbolic reparations for survivors and their spouses.

In 2007, she co-founded the Colour of Poverty Campaign (COPC), a campaign to address the increasing racialization of poverty in Ontario and currently serves as a steering committee member of COPC.  She continued to serve in the organization, was a member of the steering committee in 2017.

In 2017, Go appeared before a Canadian Senate hearing to discuss the impact of high fees on immigration for the at risk communities she serves in her role at Metro Toronto Chinese & Southeast Asian Legal Clinic.

Go was involved in a case involving a Chinese couple who had their rights as parents challenged because their DNA did not match the DNA of their child.

On August 6, 2021, Go was appointed to the Federal Court by Minister of Justice and Attorney General David Lametti.

Awards and honours 
 Women's Law Association of Ontario President's Award (2002)
 City of Toronto William P. Hubbard Race Relations Award (2008)
 Federation of Asian Canadian Lawyers (FACL) Lawyer of Distinction Award (2012)
 Member of the Order of Ontario (2014)

References 

1963 births
Living people
Canadian women lawyers
Members of the Order of Ontario
Lawyers in Ontario
Canadian people of Hong Kong descent